Phaulothamnus is a genus of plants formerly included in the family Phytolaccaceae but now considered a part of the Achatocarpaceae.

Only one species is recognized: Phaulothamnus spinescens A. Gray, native to Texas, Tamaulipas, Nuevo León, Sonora and Baja California. This is a branching shrub with juicy berries. Common names includes devilqueen, snake-eyes or putia.

Phaulothamnus spinescens is a branching shrub up to 250 cm tall, with spines along the branches. Leaves are broader than wide, up to 35 mm wide but rarely more than 12 mm long. Flowers are borne one at a time or in racemes. Fruits are spherical, juicy, white to greenish with the black seeds visible through the thin fruit wall.

References

Monotypic Caryophyllales genera
Caryophyllales
Flora of Texas
Flora of Tamaulipas
Flora of Nuevo León
Flora of Sonora
Flora of Baja California